Wagon Heels is a 1945 Warner Bros. Merrie Melodies short directed by Bob Clampett. The short was released on July 28, 1945, and stars Porky Pig.

The cartoon is a color remake of the 1938 Looney Tunes black-and-white short Injun Trouble. All voices except narration and Sloppy Moe are performed by Mel Blanc, whose  screen credit is his first in a non-Bugs Bunny cartoon. In addition to the usual Native American stereotype music, Carl Stalling's underscore frequently plays segments of the American Civil War tune, "Kingdom Coming", even converting it to a minor key in one segment. "Oh! Susanna" is also heard repeatedly in the underscore.

The cartoon has been criticized for its stereotypical and insensitive depictions of Native Americans.

The film is set during the California Gold Rush, and depicts Porky Pig leading a wagon train to California. He is opposed by Injun Joe, a Native American chief who has claimed any area to the west of the Eastern Seaboard as his own.

Plot
The cartoon opens in 1849, with narration by Robert C. Bruce, over a spurious map showing a sliver of land on the Eastern Seaboard labeled "USA", with all land to its west labeled "INJUN JOE'S TERRITORY". Porky Pig is leading a wagon train to California and he must keep an eye out for the Herculean Native American "Super Chief", Injun Joe. The name is a play on the famous Santa Fe train run of the same name (a frequent reference in WB cartoons), and reinforced by each character spouting smoke and crying "Woo-woo!" like a steam locomotive, each time they say Injun Joe's name. It is also a nod to an antagonistic literary character from Mark Twain's The Adventures of Tom Sawyer.

Porky and Injun Joe are repeatedly interrupted by a goofy bearded hillbilly named Sloppy Moe (a play on "Sloppy Joe"), who keeps repeating, "I know something I won't tell, I won't tell, I won't tell!" to the tune of London Bridge is Falling Down. This goes on until Injun Joe corners Porky with tomahawk in hand, and Sloppy Moe sings his refrain once more. Injun Joe grabs him and demands, "What you know, Huh???", and Sloppy reveals his secret at last, "Injun... Joe... is... ticklish!", and proceeds to prove that by tickling the chief with his hands and beard. The Native American goes into a raucous laughing fit. Distracted, he backs off a cliff and falls deep into the ground, pulling the surface down with him, and causing the map seen at the beginning of the cartoon to stretch the "USA" sliver across to the west coast, so that it now reads "UNITED STATES of AMERICA" from west to east.

The cartoon closes with the narrator returning to lionize the cartoon's heroes, Porky and Sloppy Moe, and irises-out with Moe tickling the giggling Porky.

Home media
Wagon Heels is available as part of the Looney Tunes Golden Collection: Volume 5.
Wagon Heels is also available as part of the Looney Tunes Superstars: Porky Pig and Friends: Hilarious Ham''.

See also
 Looney Tunes and Merrie Melodies filmography (1940–1949)

References

External links
 

Merrie Melodies short films
1945 animated films
1945 short films
1945 films
Films directed by Bob Clampett
1940s Western (genre) comedy films
Films about the California Gold Rush
Films about Native Americans
Porky Pig films
Films set in 1849
Short film remakes
Films scored by Carl Stalling
Western (genre) animated films
American Western (genre) comedy films
1945 comedy films
1940s Warner Bros. animated short films
Films about hillbillies